Kentucky Route 3630 is an east–west state highway in Jackson and Laurel Counties. The route was formerly KY 30 until it was rerouted.

Route description
KY 3630 begins at an intersection with KY 578 in Laurel County, heading north on a two-lane undivided road. The route passes through farmland with some homes and curves to the northwest. The road heads into a mix of farms and woods, winding north and entering Jackson County. KY 3630 heads west and intersects the southern terminus of KY 577. The route turns to the north and winds through more wooded areas with some fields, turning northeast and intersecting the southern terminus of KY 2002. The road heads through several more miles of rural areas with some homes and curves to the east. KY 3630 intersects the southern terminus of KY 290 and heads into Annville, where it passes through residential areas. In the center of Annville, the route forms a brief concurrency with KY 578 and curves northeast as it comes to the junction with KY 3444. KY 3630 heads through more rural areas with some development before coming to its eastern terminus at KY 30. At this point, the road continues east as part of KY 30.

Major intersections

References

3630
3630
3630